Two Minoan snake goddess figurines were excavated in 1903 in the Minoan palace at Knossos in the Greek island of Crete.  The decades-long excavation programme led by the English archaeologist Arthur Evans greatly expanded knowledge and awareness of the Bronze Age Minoan civilization, but Evans has subsequently been criticised for overstatements and excessively speculative ideas, both in terms of his "restoration" of specific objects, including the most famous of these figures, and the ideas about the Minoans he drew from the archaeology.  The figures are now on display at the Heraklion Archaeological Museum ("AMH").

The Knossos figurines, both significantly incomplete, date to near the end of the neo-palatial period of Minoan civilization, around 1600 BCE. It was Evans who called the larger of his pair of figurines a "Snake Goddess", the smaller a "Snake Priestess"; since then, it has been debated whether Evans was right, or whether both figurines depict priestesses, or both depict the same deity or distinct deities.

The combination of elaborate clothes that leave the breasts completely bare, and "snake-wrangling", attracted considerable publicity, not to mention various fakes, and the smaller figure in particular remains a popular icon for Minoan art and religion, now also generally referred to as a  "Snake Goddess". But archaeologists have found few comparable images, and a snake goddess plays little part in current thinking about the cloudy topic of Minoan religion.

Knossos figurines

The two Knossos snake goddess figurines were found by Evans's excavators in one of a group of stone-lined and lidded cists Evans called the "Temple Repositories", since they contained a variety of objects that were presumably no longer required for use, perhaps after a fire.  The figurines are made of faience, a crushed quartz-paste material which after firing gives a true vitreous finish with bright colors and a lustrous sheen. This material symbolized the renewal of life in old Egypt, therefore it was used in the funeral cult and in the sanctuaries.

The larger of these figures has snakes crawling over her arms and up to her "tall cylindrical crown", at the top of which a snake's head rears up.  The figure lacked the body below the waist, one arm, and part of the crown. She has prominent bare breasts, with what seems to be one or more snakes winding round them. Because of the missing pieces, it is not clear if it is one or more snakes around her arms. Her dress includes a thick belt with a "sacred knot".

The smaller figure, as restored, holds two snakes in her raised hands, and the figure on her head-dress is a cat or panther.  However, as excavated, she lacked a head and the proper left arm was missing below the elbow.  The head was recreated by Evans and one of his restorers. The crown was an incomplete fragment in the same pit, and the cat/panther was another separate piece, which Evans only decided belonged to the figure some time later, partly because there seemed to be matching fittings on the crown and cat.  Recent scholars seem somewhat more ready to accept that the hat and cat belong together than that either or both belong to the rest of the figure.  

A third figure, intermediate in size, is broken off at the waist, but the lower part is comparable.  The cist also contained another arm that might have held a snake.

Other Minoan figures

Another figurine now in Berlin, made of bronze, has on her head what may be three snakes, or just tresses of hair.  She seems to be a priestess or worshipper rather than a deity, as she is stooped slightly forward, and making the Minoan worship gesture of a facepalm with one hand and the other brought up to the chest or, in this case, the throat.  The one breast visible has a prominent nipple, so is presumably intended to be bare.  This is probably Late Minoan I, rather later than the Knossos figures.

Later still are some terracotta votive offerings, probably representing the goddess rather than humans, in at least one case "snake-wrangling" and with snakes rising from the diadem or headress.  This type of figure often has attributes rising from the headress, typified by the Poppy goddess (AMH).

Fakes
The tremendous impact of the Knossos figures, once published by Evans and in a book by the Italian doctor Angelo Mosso, quickly led to ingenious fakes. A figure in the Boston Museum of Fine Arts with an ivory body and gold snakes twined around the arms is now generally regarded as a fake. It was bought by the museum in 1914.

Another figure, in the Walters Art Museum in Baltimore, is a small steatite bare-breasted female figurine with a snake engraved around her headdress, and holes pierced through her clenched fists, presumably to suggest these held snakes. This is also now regarded as a fake.  It was bought by Henry Walters from a dealer in Paris in 1929, and left to the museum in 1931.

Interpretations

Emily Bonney regards the figures as reflective of Syrian religion which had a brief impact on Crete, when "the elites at Knossos emulated Syrian iconography as an assertion of their access to exotic knowledge and control of trade."  

The figurines are probably (according to Burkert) related to the Paleolithic traditions regarding women and domesticity. The figurines have also been interpreted as showing a mistress of animals-type goddess and as a precursor to Athena Parthenos, who is also associated with snakes.

The serpent is often symbolically associated with the renewal of life because it sheds its skin periodically. A similar belief existed in the ancient Mesopotamians and Semites, and appears also in Hindu mythology. The Pelasgian myth of creation refers to snakes as the reborn dead. However, Martin P. Nilsson noticed that in the Minoan religion the snake was the protector of the house, as it later appears also in Greek religion. Within the Greek Dionysiac cult it signified wisdom and was the symbol of fertility.

Barry Powell suggested that the "snake goddess" reduced in legend into a folklore heroine was Ariadne (whose name might mean "utterly pure" or "the very holy one"), who is often depicted surrounded by Maenads and satyrs. Hans Georg Wunderlich related the snake goddess with the Phoenician Astarte (virgin daughter). She was the goddess of fertility and sexuality and her worship was connected with an orgiastic cult. Her temples were decorated with serpentine motifs. In a related Greek myth Europa, who is sometimes identified with Astarte in ancient sources, was a Phoenician princess whom Zeus abducted and carried to Crete. Evans tentatively linked the snake goddess with the Egyptian snake goddess Wadjet but did not pursue this connection. Statuettes similar to the "snake goddess" type identified as "priest of Wadjet" and "magician" were found in Egypt.

While the statuette's true function is somewhat unclear, her exposed and amplified breasts suggest that she is probably some sort of fertility figure. The figurines may illustrate the fashion of dress of Minoan women, however, it is also possible that bared breasts represented a sign of mourning. Homer gives a literary description of this kind of mourning, and this was also observed by Herodotus among Egyptian women.

The snake goddess's Minoan name may be related with A-sa-sa-ra, a possible interpretation of inscriptions found in Linear A texts. Although Linear A is not yet deciphered, Palmer relates tentatively the inscription a-sa-sa-ra-me which seems to have accompanied goddesses, with the Hittite išhaššara, which means "mistress".

Sacral knot
Both goddesses have a knot with a projecting looped cord between their breasts. Evans noticed that these are analogous to the sacral knot, his name for a knot with a loop of fabric above and sometimes fringed ends hanging down below. Numerous such symbols in ivory, faience, painted in frescoes or engraved in seals sometimes combined with the symbol of the double-edged axe or labrys which was the most important Minoan religious symbol. Such symbols were found in Minoan and Mycenaean sites. It is believed that the sacral knot was the symbol of holiness on human figures or cult-objects. Its combination with the double-axe can  be compared with the Egyptian ankh (eternal life), or with the tyet (welfare/life) a symbol of Isis (the knot of Isis).

Art
The 1979 feminist artwork The Dinner Party by Judy Chicago features a place setting for a "Snake Goddess".

Gallery

See also
Ishtar
Gorgon (female monsters with sharp fangs and hair of living, venomous snakes in Greek mythology)
Master of Animals
Matriarchal religion
Wadjet
Snake worship (in Hindu mythology)

Notes

References
"Boston": "Statuette of a snake goddess", Boston MFA page - "about 1600–1500 B.C. or early 20th century"
German, Senta, "Snake Goddess", Khan Academy 
Hood, Sinclair, The Arts in Prehistoric Greece, 1978, Penguin (Penguin/Yale History of Art),

Further reading
Lapatin, Kenneth, Mysteries of the Snake Goddess: Art, Desire, and the Forging of History, 2002, Houghton Mifflin ISBN 0618144757

External links

17th-century BC works
1903 archaeological discoveries
Minoan archaeological artifacts
2nd-millennium BC sculptures
Greek mythology
Mother goddesses
Minoan religion
snake
Snake goddesses
Legendary serpents
Sculpture forgeries
Sculptures of goddesses
Heraklion Archaeological Museum
Snakes in art
Astarte
Ariadne